Minuscule 593 (in the Gregory-Aland numbering), ε 319 (von Soden), is a Greek minuscule manuscript of the New Testament, on parchment. Palaeographically it has been assigned to the 13th century. The manuscript is lacunose. It was labelled by Scrivener as 462.
It has marginalia.

Description 

The codex contains the text of the Mark 1:44-Luke 24:53; John 1:15-11:13 on 153 parchment leaves (size ) with lacunae. It is written in one column per page, 22 lines per page.

There is also a division according to the Ammonian Sections (in Mark 237 Sections - the last in 16:15), but without a references to the Eusebian Canons. It contains lectionary markings, and incipits.

Text 

The Greek text of the codex is a representative of the Byzantine text-type. Hermann von Soden suggested that it is related to the textual families Πa and Πb.

Aland placed it in Category V. According to Claremont Profile Method it represents the textual family Π266 in Luke 1, Luke 10, and Luke 20.

History 

It was wrongly called an Evangelistarium in the Supplementary Catalogue.

The manuscript was added to the list of New Testament manuscripts by Scrivener. It was examined by Dean Burgon.

The manuscript currently is housed at the Biblioteca Marciana (Gr. I,58 (1214)), at Venice.

See also 

 List of New Testament minuscules
 Biblical manuscript
 Textual criticism

References

Further reading 

 

Greek New Testament minuscules
13th-century biblical manuscripts